

Overview of the U.S. Aid Program in Vietnam
U.S.-Vietnam diplomatic and economic relations were non-existent for more than fifteen years following communist North Vietnam's victory in 1975 over U.S. ally South Vietnam. During that time, the United States maintained restrictions on
foreign assistance to unified Vietnam.

Normalization of relations—particularly in the economic sphere—began hesitantly in the early 1990s, progressed incrementally
through the mid- and late 1990s, and then accelerated markedly following the signing of a Bilateral Trade Agreement (BTA) in 2000. One measure of the pace of the normalization of bilateral economic relations is the increase in trade flows, which
rose from about $200 million in 1994 to over $1 billion in 2000, to nearly $4.5 billion in 2003. The United States is now Vietnam's largest trading partner.

The resumption of U.S. aid to Vietnam has closely tracked the normalization of bilateral relations. U.S. assistance began as a trickle in 1991, when around $1 million was spent for prosthetics for Vietnamese war victims, and increased to nearly $50
million in fiscal year (FY) 2004 covering a broad range of programs. Moreover, the level of assistance has more than doubled since FY2000. (See Table 1) For FY2005 through the end of April 2005, nearly $55 million in assistance had been spent.

By far the two largest components of the U.S. bilateral aid program are food assistance and health-related assistance, which together comprised about 60% of the nearly $200 million in aid the United States has provided to Vietnam since U.S.
assistance began to increase substantially in FY1999. Spending on HIV/AIDS treatment and prevention in Vietnam has risen, especially since President Bush's June 2004 designation of Vietnam as a "focus country" eligible to receive increased
funding to combat HIV-AIDS under PEPFAR. The United States provided $10
million in PEPFAR funds in FY2004, and over $27 million for FY2005 through the end of April.

Since mid-December 2004, Vietnam has reported over 30 cases, at least 14 of them fatal, of the H5 avian influenza (also known as the "bird flu"), raising concerns that the disease is re-emerging after an outbreak in early 2004 spread across Asia.

Other sizeable assistance items include demining activities and programs assisting Vietnam's economic reform efforts. This latter group of programs has been designed to help the Vietnamese government implement the economic liberalization reforms it committed to in the 2000 U.S.-Vietnam Bilateral Trade Agreement and
will likely be required to undertake as part of its desire to join the World Trade Organization (WTO).2 Hanoi has set a goal of attaining WTO membership by the end of 2005. The U.S. also funds educational exchanges with Vietnam, principally
the Vietnam Fulbright program, which receives more funding (typically $4 million annually) than any other Fulbright program in the world. These programs are not included in Table 1 because they are not funded through the foreign policy budget and confer benefits to both the U.S. and Vietnam. Additionally, the United States administers the Vietnam Education Foundation, which was established by Congress in 2000 to provide $5 million annually for scholarships and educational exchanges. Funds for the foundation are recycled from the Vietnamese government's repayments of the wartime debts South Vietnam owed the United States. Total annual funding for educational exchanges, including the Fulbright and Vietnam Education Foundation programs, has been in the $9–$11 million range since FY2003.

Vietnam and the Millennium Challenge Account
In May 2004, Vietnam was not selected as one of the first 16 countries eligible
for the Millennium Challenge Account (MCA). Vietnam was deemed ineligible,
despite meeting the technical requirements for MCA eligibility, because it scored
very low on some of the indicators used to measure political freedom. Vietnam again
was included in the list of candidate countries for FY2005, from which eligible
countries will be selected in late 2004. In September 2004, Vietnam again received
low scores on the indicators of political and civil liberties maintained used by the
Millennium Challenge Corporation to determine eligibility for the MCA.

Relative to other countries in Southeast Asia, Vietnam receives far less than
Indonesia and the Philippines, front-line states in the war on terrorism that received
an estimated $150 million and $110 million in FY2004, respectively. Assistance to
Vietnam is roughly on a par with the next two largest Southeast Asian recipients of
U.S. aid, Cambodia ($50 million) and East Timor ($30 million). Relative to the rest
of the world, Southeast Asia is not a target for large U.S. aid programs, in part
because many countries in the region have "graduated" from economic aid.

Future Areas for Possible Expansion
If U.S.-Vietnam relations continue to deepen, particularly in the political and
military spheres, it is possible to foresee a continued expansion of the U.S. aid
program in Vietnam. Possible areas for new or expanded programs include
strengthening the rule of law (particularly judicial capacity building),
counternarcotics, anti-corruption, education management, and the preservation of
cultural and historical sites. On top of these items, two new programs currently are
being considered for Vietnam:

IMET (International Military Education and Training).
Vietnam and the United States gradually have been expanding their embryonic security ties, which
have lagged far behind the economic aspect of the relationship. Some in the United States see Vietnamese and U.S. security interests as mutually reinforcing, particularly
with regard to China, and hope to develop military-to-military relations. These
efforts culminated in November 2003, when Vietnamese Defense Minister Pham Van
Tra visited Washington. Later that month, the guided missile frigate USS
Vandergrift and its 200 crew members made a four-day call at the port of Saigon.
Both events were firsts since the end of the Vietnam War and were followed up by
additional visits in 2004. One option for expanding military-to-military relations
would be establishing a bilateral IMET program. Since FY2002, the Bush
Administration has requested funds for Expanded International Military Education
and Training (E-IMET) courses to enhance English language proficiency among
Vietnamese military officers. The program is designed to "facilitate [the officers']
attendance at conferences and confidence building meetings hosted by Pacific
Command Headquarters." No funds have been disbursed, however, because Vietnam
and the United States have not yet signed an IMET agreement. Funding for IMET
programs would be affected by the restrictions in the proposed Vietnam Human
Rights Act.

In an interview with the Washington Post days before departing for his June 21,
2005 summit with President Bush, Vietnamese Prime Minister Pham Van Khai said that during his trip to Washington, the United States and Vietnam would announce
the launch of a bilateral IMET program.

Peace Corps.
The Vietnamese government in early 2004 invited the U.S. Peace Corps to Vietnam to begin discussion of opening a country program. Over 20 countries, including Cambodia, have made similar invitations. The Peace Corps has
welcomed the invitation and in the near future intends to conduct a country
assessment. Generally, if a country assessment team makes a positive report, it takes
12 to 18 months for a program to be established. New programs typically cost on the
order of $1 million-$2 million annually. In its report (S.Rept. 108–346)
accompanying the FY2005 Foreign Operations bill (S. 2812), the Senate
Appropriations Committee expressed its support for opening a new program in
Vietnam. The Vietnam Human Rights Act's restrictions would not have directly
affected the Peace Corps.

Agent Orange.
Prime Minister Pham Van Khai indicated that one of his mid-
level priorities during his trip to the United States in June 2005 is obtaining U.S.
assistance for Agent Orange victims. During President Bill Clinton's five-day trip
to Vietnam in 2000, the United States agreed to set up a joint research study on the
effects of dioxin/Agent Orange. Over three million Vietnamese suffering from the
alleged effects of Agent Orange were part of a class action suit filed in U.S. Federal
District Court in Brooklyn against the chemical companies that manufactured the
defoliant. The case was dismissed in March 2005, in a ruling that was widely
publicized in Vietnam. In April 2005, the Bush Administration discontinued funding
of a grant to conduct research in Vietnam on the possible relationship between Agent
Orange and birth defects. The justification for the decision was that the Vietnamese
Ministry of Health had not given its approval for the study.

Recent Attempts to Restrict Aid
In recent years, Congress has devoted considerable attention to Vietnam's
human rights record. Vietnam is a one-party, authoritarian state. Since at least the
late 1990s, the ruling Vietnamese Communist Party (VCP) appears to have followed
a strategy of relaxing most restrictions on most forms of personal and religious
expression while selectively repressing individuals and organizations that it deems
a threat to the party's monopoly on political power. Most prominently, the
government has cracked down harshly on protests against various government
policies by certain ethnic minority groups, particularly the Montagnards in the
country's Central Highlands and the Hmong in the Northwest Highlands. The
government also has stepped up repression of so-called cyber dissidents who have
criticized the government over the Internet. On September 15, 2004, the State
Department, under the International Religious Freedom Act (P.L. 105–292), for the
first time designated Vietnam as a "country of particular concern," principally because of reports of worsening harassment of certain groups of ethnic minority
Protestants and Buddhists. By law, within 90 days (extendable for another 90-day
period), the President must decide on a course of action, including sanctions, with
regard to Vietnam's religious rights situation. The President extended the review
period, meaning that a decision must be made by mid-March 2005.

A Review of the U.S.-Vietnam Normalization Process and the Restoration of U.S. Aid to Vietnam
Congress played a key role in both the cessation of aid to Vietnam in the 1970s,
and its restoration in the 1990s.

Cold War Restrictions on Aid
For much of the Cold War, aid to North Vietnam and most other communist
countries was prohibited.  (Aid was prohibited under section 620(f) of the Foreign Assistance Act of 1961, among
other statutes.) The United States provided significant military and
economic assistance to its ally, South Vietnam, particularly after the U.S. became
overtly involved in inter-Vietnamese hostilities in 1965. In 1973, following the
conclusion of a Paris Peace Agreement that brought an end to U.S. military
involvement in Vietnam, Congress began cutting Nixon Administration requests for
military and economic assistance to South Vietnam. President Richard Nixon's
pledge to provide reconstruction aid to North Vietnam also proved unpopular in
Congress, particularly after the collapse of the north–south cease-fire negotiated in
Paris.

After the victory of communist North Vietnam over South Vietnam in April
1975, the United States ended virtually all bilateral economic interchange, including
foreign assistance, with unified Vietnam. (Prohibitions on assistance to Vietnam were included in P.L. 94–41, a continuing
appropriations resolution signed into law by President Gerald Ford in the summer of 1975.) The restrictions included a halt to bilateral humanitarian aid, opposition to financial aid from international financial
institutions (such as the World Bank), a ban on U.S. travel to Vietnam, and an
embargo on bilateral trade. President Gerald Ford linked the provision of economic
assistance to Hanoi's cooperation in returning and accounting for POWs and MIAs.
In the FY1977 foreign aid appropriations bill Congress prohibited the use of any
funds to provide assistance to Vietnam, a provision that was repeated annually until
its removal in 1994.

In the early months of his administration, President Jimmy Carter (1977–1981) and the communist regime in Hanoi attempted to negotiate the outlines of a normalization agreement that would include U.S. assistance. The negotiations stalled, however, when the Vietnamese responded that they would neither agree to establish relations nor furnish information on U.S. POW/MIAs until the United States pledged to provide several billion dollars in postwar reconstruction aid.
Simultaneously, Congress objected to Carter's moves by reinforcing existing prohibitions on aid to Vietnam. Normalization efforts ultimately were thwarted in 1978 by Vietnam's decision to align with the Soviet Union, its invasion of Cambodia, and its expulsion of nearly half a million ethnic Chinese who then became
refugees in Southeast Asia.

The Normalization Process since the Early 1990s
Washington and Hanoi gradually began to normalize relations in the early 1990s, following Vietnam's withdrawal from Cambodia and improvements in Hanoi's cooperation on the issue of American prisoners of war (POWs) and missing-in-action (MIA) personnel in Vietnam. Economic assistance was resumed in 1991, when the administration of George H. W. Bush announced plans to send $1.3 million to fit disabled Vietnamese with artificial limbs.19 The announcement came days after Washington and Hanoi agreed to open an office in Vietnam to resolve outstanding MIA cases. In subsequent years, annual aid flows were generally small and limited to disaster assistance and humanitarian programs—such as prosthetics and aid to orphans—to ameliorate the effects of the war.

Coinciding with these developments, in 1991 and 1992 the Senate Select
Committee on POW/MIA affairs—chaired by John Kerry and vice-chaired by Bob
Smith—conducted what many consider the most extensive independent
investigation of the POW/MIA issue undertaken. In early 1993, the committee issued
its report, which concluded that there was "no compelling evidence" that POWs were
alive after the U.S. withdrawal from Vietnam, and that although there was no
"conspiracy" in Washington to cover up live POWs, the U.S. government had
seriously neglected and mismanaged the issue, particularly in the 1970s. The
committee's televised hearings played a major role in defusing much of the passion
that had surrounded the POW issue.

The U.S. aid program in Vietnam expanded gradually through the 1990s, in step
with the acceleration of the normalization process. In 1993, President Bill Clinton
announced that the United States would no longer oppose international financial
institution aid to Vietnam. The following year, President Clinton ordered an end to
the U.S. trade embargo on Vietnam, a move that followed shortly after a vote in the
Senate urging the embargo to be lifted. Ambassadors were exchanged in 1997. In Title II of the FY1991 Foreign Operations bill (P.L. 101–513) provided these funds,
notwithstanding other legal provisions, including the ban on bilateral aid to Vietnam.

1998, President Clinton granted Vietnam its first waiver from the requirements of the
so-called Jackson–Vanik Amendment (contained in the Trade Act of 1974, Title IV,
section 402), which prohibit the President from normalizing commercial relations
with selected socialist and formerly socialist countries if they do not meet certain
requirements regarding freedom of emigration. A congressional resolution
disapproving the waiver was defeated, as have such resolutions disapproving the
presidential waivers issued every year since.

All of these steps provoked considerable controversy in Congress, though
opposition to normalization decreased incrementally throughout the 1990s.
Following the signing of the BTA in 2000, Congress overwhelmingly approved the
agreement, which paved the way for the two countries to extend normal trade
relations (NTR) status on a nonpermanent basis to one another. The signing of the
BTA marked the end to legal restrictions on virtually all commercial transactions
and most forms of economic assistance to Vietnam. Also in 2000, the Clinton
Administration, in an undated unpublished determination, on national interest
grounds, exempted Vietnam from the prohibition on most forms of assistance to
communist countries contained in section 620(f) of the Foreign Assistance Act of
1961.

Vietnam and the United States gradually have been expanding their political and
security ties, although these have lagged far behind the economic aspect of the
relationship. In 2003 and 2004, however, Vietnam's leadership appears to have
decided to expand their country's ties to the United States, as indicated by the
aforementioned military-to-military meetings and ship visits. It is still unclear how
far, how fast, and in what form any new security relationship will develop.

Further reading
Public domain CRS Report: "Overview of the U.S. Aid Program in Vietnam"
For more on U.S.-Vietnam relations, see CRS Issue Brief IB98033, The Vietnam-U.S. Normalization Process.
For more on the Bilateral Trade Agreement, see CRS Report RL30416, The Vietnam-U.S. Bilateral Trade Agreement, by Mark Manyin. link
For more on the Millennium Challenge Account, see CRS Report RL32427, Millennium Challenge Account: Implementation of a New U.S. Foreign Aid Initiative, by Larry Nowels.
For more on the POW/MIA issue, see CRS Issue Brief IB92101, POWs and MIAs: Status and Accounting Issues, by Robert Goldich. link
For a more detailed account of the history of U.S.-Vietnam normalization, see CRS Issue Brief IB98033, The Vietnam-U.S. Normalization Process, by Mark Manyin.

United States–Vietnam relations